The 8th Glover Trophy was a motor race, run to Formula One rules, held on 18 April 1960 at Goodwood Circuit, England. The race was run over 42 laps of the circuit, and was won by British driver Innes Ireland in a Lotus 18. This was the first Formula 1 win for the Lotus marque in an international race (there had been an earlier win at Davidstow, Cornwall in 1954 in a national race).

Results

References
 "The Grand Prix Who's Who", Steve Small, 1995.
 Results at www.silhouet.com 
 Results at the F2 Register 

Glover Trophy
Glover Trophy
20th century in West Sussex
Glover